Samuel Sandars (25 April 1837, Chelmsford, Essex  - 15 June 1894) was an English bibliographer, barrister and university benefactor.

He was educated at Harrow and Trinity College, Cambridge, where he took his BA degree in 1860 and became MA in 1863. Admitted to the Inner Temple in 1859, Sandars was called to the Bar in 1863. In July 1863 Sandars married Elizabeth Maria, eldest daughter of Francis William Russell, MP for Limerick.<ref>Gentleman's Magazine, vol. 215, 1863, p. 236</ref>

Sandars was a Fellow of the Royal Geographical Society, a Fellow of the Royal Historical Society, a member of the Library Association and a member of the Bibliographical Society. He became JP for Buckinghamshire, and shortly before his death in 1894 High Sheriff of Buckinghamshire.

From 1869 onwards Sandars donated rare books to Cambridge University Library; he bequeathed 1,460 printed books to the library on his death.Fabian, Bernhard, Handbuch deutscher historischer Buchbestände in Europa, 1997, p. 178 He was also a benefactor to the Fitzwilliam Museum, Great St Mary's Church and the Divinity School in Cambridge, and bequeathed £2000 to Cambridge University to endow the Sandars Readership in Bibliography for the delivery of one or more lectures annually on "Bibliography, Palaeography, Typography, Bookbinding, Book Illustration, the science of Books and Manuscripts and the Arts relating thereto."

References

Further readingThe Cambridge Review'', 1894

External links
Sandars family tree
Samuel Sandars: Book Lists and Cambridge Miscellanea at Cambridge University Library
The Sandars Readership in Bibliography

1837 births
1894 deaths
English philanthropists
High Sheriffs of Buckinghamshire
Members of the Inner Temple
People educated at Harrow School
Alumni of Trinity College, Cambridge
English bibliographers
English book and manuscript collectors
19th-century British philanthropists
19th-century English lawyers